The 1893 Crescent Athletic Club football team was an American football team that represented the Crescent Athletic Club in the American Football Union (AFU) during the 1893 college football season. The team played its home games at Eastern Park in Brooklyn and compiled a 3–6 record. J. Harry Sheldon, a member of the Crescent team since 1887, served as the team's captain.

Schedule

References

Crescent Athletic Club
Crescent Athletic Club football seasons
Crescent Athletic Club football